Wanted by the Law is a 1924 American silent Western film directed by Robert N. Bradbury and starring J.B. Warner, Jay Morley and William McCall.

Cast
 J.B. Warner as Jim Loraine
 Jay Morley as Bill Baxter 
 William McCall as Henchman Bush McGraw 
 Frank Rice as Jerry Hawkins
 Thomas G. Lingham as Sheriff Rufe Matlock
 Dorothy Wood as Jessie Walton
 Jay Hunt as Sandy Walton 
 Billie Bennett as Mrs. Loraine 
 Ralph McCullough as Bud Loraine 
 Jack Waltemeyer as Idaho Sheriff

References

Bibliography
 Langman, Larry. A Guide to Silent Westerns. Greenwood Publishing Group, 1992.

External links
 

1924 films
1924 Western (genre) films
1920s English-language films
American black-and-white films
Films directed by Robert N. Bradbury
Silent American Western (genre) films
1920s American films